Swangz Avenue is an audio and film production house in Uganda. As a record label, Swangz Avenue is more lined with music production projects, artist management, digital distribution, music publishing and events management. Swangz Avenue is the brainchild of a Ugandan musician Benon Mugumya, who started this music production back in 2008.

Releases
The company has been very influential in the Ugandan music sector as it has recorded and released some of the best songs with a variety of local and global musicians. A number of Ugandan artists have released some good music from this production house, some of them are:
Goodlyfe Crew
Iryn Namubiru
Irene Ntale
Aziz Azion
GNL Zamba
Vampino
Vinka
Winnie Nwagi
Azawi
Zafaran (Latest signee)

Management of artists
Young Zee was signed 12 March 2012 by Swangz Avenue and his debut single "I Have A Dream" featuring label mate Sera was released in the same very year. In 2013, Swangz Avenue officially unveiled its new musician under the management of Swangz Avenue label, Young Zee a 14-year-old and, Sera who died. 
Other musicians that have ranked through Swangz Avenue are:
Micheal Ross
Viboyo Oweyo
James B
Vampino
Benon 
Young Zee
Vinka
Winnie Nwagi
Azawi
Zafaran (Latest Signee)

Selected production discography

"Where You Are" by Goodlyfe Crew
"Locomotive" by All Stars
MR DJ by All Stars

References

Recording studios in Uganda
African record labels
Entertainment companies based in Uganda